Amblyseius comatus is a species of mite in the family Phytoseiidae.

References

comatus
Articles created by Qbugbot
Animals described in 1988